Tomislav Kelava (born 10 August 1933) is a Serbian boxer. He competed in the men's welterweight event at the 1960 Summer Olympics.

References

1933 births
Living people
Serbian male boxers
Yugoslav male boxers
Olympic boxers of Yugoslavia
Boxers at the 1960 Summer Olympics
Welterweight boxers